is a Japanese modern pentathlete. Murakami represented Japan at the 2008 Summer Olympics in Beijing, where he finished thirty-first in the men's event, with a score of 4,744 points.

References

External links
 
 NBC 2008 Olympics profile

Japanese male modern pentathletes
1976 births
Living people
Olympic modern pentathletes of Japan
Modern pentathletes at the 2008 Summer Olympics
People from Shizuoka (city)
Asian Games medalists in modern pentathlon
Modern pentathletes at the 2002 Asian Games
Asian Games bronze medalists for Japan
Medalists at the 2002 Asian Games